Detouring America is a 1939 Warner Bros. Merrie Melodies cartoon directed by Tex Avery. The short was released on August 26, 1939.

Plot
A tour of the United States, with recurring checks on the progress of the human fly climbing the Empire State Building. Also featured are jokes and gags on the Everglades, the Wyoming prairies, Alaska, a California prospector, Sioux Indians and a Jerry Colonna-esque (literal) Texas cow-puncher.

Home media
LaserDisc – The Golden Age of Looney Tunes, Volume 5, Side 2 (USA 1995 Turner print)
DVD – Each Dawn I Die (USA 1995 Turner print added as a bonus)

Censorship
Two scenes are excised from the cartoon when aired on Cartoon Network and Boomerang United States television networks due to ethnic stereotyping against Native Americans and Inuit. They are:
The scene with a poor, black hitchhiker at the North Pole, who sings "Carry Me Back to Ol' Virginny". Then, an Eskimo sends him back by taking him all the way back to the Virginia state line.
The scene with an Indian mother dealing with her dopey, oversized, adult son she's carrying on her back.

References

1939 animated films
Films directed by Tex Avery
Merrie Melodies short films
1939 films
Films scored by Carl Stalling
Vitaphone short films
1930s Warner Bros. animated short films